Chuck Hossfeld (born January 4, 1977) is an American race car driver and team owner. He is a former racer in the NASCAR Craftsman Truck Series, NASCAR Whelen Modified Tour, and NASCAR Whelen Southern Modified Tour.

Hossfeld began racing at the age of twelve in kart racing at Lancaster Speedway. Five years later, he began racing stock cars at local short tracks and moved to North Carolina, working for former modified drivers Brett Bodine and Randy LaJoie. After making several starts in the USAR Hooters ProCup Series for LaJoie, he auditioned for the Roush Racing Gong Show and was hired to replace reigning champion Greg Biffle in the #50 Ford F-150. He made his Truck debut at the 2000 season finale at California Speedway in the #49 Roush Performance Products Ford for Roush, starting 14th and finishing 31st after suffering engine failure.

Hossfeld began his full-time rookie campaign in 2001 without major sponsorship before Eldon came on board, and Hossfeld had a tenth-place run at Pikes Peak International Raceway. Hossfeld was released from the ride a few weeks later, along with rookie teammate Nathan Haseleu, who won the Gong Show competition with Hossfeld.

In 2002, Hossfeld began racing in the Featherlite Modified Series in the #4 Dodge for Bob Garbarino. He finished third, second, and seventh, respectively, in the standings over the next three seasons, amassing a total of five wins. He moved to Don Barker's team in 2005, gaining five top-fives and finishing third in the points. He competed in the 40th Annual Stock Car Racing at New Smyrna Speedway, finishing third in the championship. He last raced in the #4 asphalt modified for Robert Garbarino in the 2016 Toyota Mod Classic 150 at Oswego Speedway, starting 14th and finishing 6th. In total, his Whelen Modified Tour statistics include 7 wins, 47 top 5s, 80 top 10s, and 9 poles in 140 starts. He also earned 3 top 5s and 5 top 10s in 9 starts in the NASCAR Whelen Southern Modified Tour.

Motorsports career results

NASCAR
(key) (Bold - Pole position awarded by qualifying time. Italics - Pole position earned by points standings or practice time. * – Most laps led.)

Craftsman Truck Series

Whelen Southern Modified Tour

External links
 Official Website
 

1977 births
Living people
NASCAR drivers
People from Porter, New York
Racing drivers from New York (state)
RFK Racing drivers